Anniston station is an Amtrak train station at 126 West 4th Street in Anniston, Alabama. It is served by the  passenger train. The station was originally designed by Milo R. Hanker and built in 1925 for the Southern Railway, and was one of the last railroad-operated active passenger stations in the country, as the Southern Crescent (predecessor to the current Amtrak train) was still operated by the Southern well into the Amtrak era.

In 2008, the city completed a full rehabilitation of the classical revival depot, primarily using funds obtained through the Federal Highway Administration's Transportation Enhancements (TE) program.

References

External links 

Anniston Amtrak Station (USA Rail Guide -- Train Web)

Buildings and structures in Anniston, Alabama
Amtrak stations in Alabama
Neoclassical architecture in Alabama
Railway stations in the United States opened in 1926
Stations along Southern Railway lines in the United States
Transportation buildings and structures in Calhoun County, Alabama